FK Astibo is a football club from Štip, Republic of North Macedonia.

History
The club was founded in 1957 and bears the ancient name of the city Štip. In its history the club has played several seasons in the Macedonian Second League.

References

External links
Club info at MacedonianFootball 
Football Federation of Macedonia 

Astibo
Sport in Štip
1957 establishments in the Socialist Republic of Macedonia